This is a list of Montreal Canadiens award winners.

League awards

Team trophies

Individual awards

All-Stars

NHL first and second team All-Stars
The NHL first and second team All-Stars are the top players at each position as voted on by the Professional Hockey Writers' Association.

NHL All-Rookie Team
The NHL All-Rookie Team consists of the top rookies at each position as voted on by the Professional Hockey Writers' Association.

All-Star Game selections
The National Hockey League All-Star Game is a mid-season exhibition game held annually between many of the top players of each season. Sixty-four All-Star Games have been held since 1947, with at least one player chosen to represent the Canadiens in each year except 2001. The All-Star game has not been held in various years: 1979 and 1987 due to the 1979 Challenge Cup and Rendez-vous '87 series between the NHL and the Soviet national team, respectively, 1995, 2005, and 2013 as a result of labour stoppages, 2006, 2010, and 2014 because of the Winter Olympic Games, and 2021 as a result of the COVID-19 pandemic. Montreal has hosted twelve of the games.

 Selected by fan vote
 All-Star Game Most Valuable Player

All-Star benefit games
Prior to the institution of the National Hockey League All-Star Game the league held three different benefit games featuring teams of all-stars.  The first was the Ace Bailey Benefit Game, held in 1934, after a violent collision with Eddie Shore of the Boston Bruins left Ace Bailey of the Toronto Maple Leafs hospitalized and unable to continue his playing career.  In 1937, the Howie Morenz Memorial Game was held to raise money for the family of Howie Morenz of the Canadiens, who died from complications after being admitted to the hospital for a broken leg.  The Babe Siebert Memorial Game was held in 1939 to raise funds for the family of the Canadiens' Babe Siebert, who drowned shortly after his retirement from professional hockey.

All-Star Game replacement events

Career achievements

Hockey Hall of Fame
In the Hockey Hall of Fame, the Canadiens boast the most enshrined Hall of Famers with 67. All of their inductees are from Canada save for former defencemen Joe Hall (United Kingdom) and Chris Chelios (United States). Thirty-six of these players are from three separate notable dynasties: 12 from 1955–60, 11 from 1964–69 and 13 from 1975–79. Howie Morenz and Georges Vezina were the first Canadiens given the honour in 1945, while Guy Carbonneau was the most recent inductee in 2019.

 Not included in Ring of Honour exhibit.

Foster Hewitt Memorial Award
Six members of the Canadiens organization have been honoured with the Foster Hewitt Memorial Award. The award is presented by the Hockey Hall of Fame to members of the radio and television industry who make outstanding contributions to their profession and the game of ice hockey during their broadcasting career.

Retired numbers

The Montreal Canadiens have retired fifteen of their jersey numbers. Also out of circulation is the number 99, which was retired league-wide for Wayne Gretzky on February 6, 2000. Gretzky did not play for the Canadiens during his 20-year NHL career and the only Canadiens to wear the number prior to its retirement were Joe Lamb, Des Roche and Leo Bourgeault during the 1934–35 season.

Team awards

Jacques Beauchamp Molson Trophy
The Jacques Beauchamp Molson Trophy is an award given to the player "who played a dominant role during the regular season, without obtaining any particular honor" as determined by the local media. It is named in honour of long-time reporter Jacques Beauchamp.

Molson Cup
The Molson Cup is an award given to the player who earns the most points from three-star selections during the regular season.

Other awards

See also
List of National Hockey League awards

Notes

References

Montreal Canadiens
Award
Award